Quintus Servilius Ahala (  365–342 BC) was a Roman general and statesman. He held the office of consul three times, in 365, 362 and 342 BC. In 360, he was appointed dictator to face a threat of invading Gauls, whom he defeated near the Colline Gate. He later served as interrex in 355 BC, and magister equitum under the dictator Marcus Fabius Ambustus in 351.

References
 
 

4th-century BC Roman consuls
Magistri equitum (Roman Republic)
Ancient Roman dictators
Ancient Roman generals
Ahala, Quintus